Popeye is a female harbor seal that has become the official seal of Friday Harbor on San Juan Island, Washington.

Biography
Since 1995, Popeye has been a frequent visitor to Friday Harbor.  Her visits became so common that in 2005, the Port of Friday Harbor named her the port's official seal. The State of Washington mandated that each public port have an "official seal," possibly thinking of an ink stamp; the Port director and Port commission: Greg Hertel, Brian Calvert and Mike Ahrenius  interpreted this differently giving the beloved seal the title.    A granite sculpture of Popeye was also commissioned and stands in Fairweather Park, adjacent to the marina.

She is known as Popeye presumably for her left eye which is a cloudy white—something that has also been reflected in her statue.

Popeye is a major attraction for the town of Friday Harbor, but few people know that it's against the law - as enforced by the National Oceanic and Atmospheric Administration - to feed any marine mammal in Washington state waters.

Popeye was featured on 92.9 KISM's Brad and John show, "When Animals Attack," on Wednesday, August 18, 2017. Popeye, the 200+ lb seal, attacked a man on Thursday, August 10 in the Friday Harbor Marina.

She has not been seen since the late 2010’s, presumably due to a natural death, as female harbor seals only live 25–35 years of age.

Gallery

References

Individual seals and sea lions
Individual animals in the United States